Tristan Klewsaat (born October 21, 1997) is an American floorball player who plays as a forward. He has won two caps for the United States national floorball team.

Career statistics

International 

1997 births
Living people
Floorball players
American floorball players

References